Visitations is a remix album from electronic artist The Juan MacLean. It was released on DFA Records in June 2006 as a download only album. The album is a compilation of remixes from a variety of artists including Reverso 68, X-Press 2, Cajmere, Putsch 79, Booka Shade and also contains an exclusive track called "Dance Floor Modulator" which features Nancy Whang of LCD Soundsystem.

Track listing
 "Tito's Way (Lindstrom & Prins Thomas Remix)" – 11:01
 "Tito's Way (Reverso68 Remix)" – 6:34
 "Tito's Way (Booka Shade Remix)" – 7:32
 "Give Me Every Little Thing (Muzik X-Press Vocal Mix)" – 7:46
 "Give Me Every Little Thing (Cajmere Mix)" – 5:20
 "Give Me Every Little Thing (Putsch 79 Disco Dub)" – 6:45
 "Give Me Every Little Thing (Eric B Deep Dub)" – 8:08
 "Love Is In The Air (Mock & Toof Remix)" – 8:16
 "Love Is In The Air (Strategy Remix)" – 6:00
 "Love Is In The Air (Heart Of The Sun Remix By Caro)" – 6:12
 "La Chine" – 3:42
 "Dance Floor Modulator" – 5:43

The Juan MacLean albums
Dance-punk albums
2006 remix albums
DFA Records remix albums